Miyū is a feminine Japanese given name.

Possible writings
Miyū can be written using different kanji characters and can mean:
美夕, "beauty, evening"
美遊, "beauty, play"
美優, "beauty, tenderness"
美憂, "beauty, worry"
実優, "fruit, tenderness"; "truth, tenderness"
心優, "heart, tenderness"
心結, "heart, bind"
海優, "sea, tenderness"
未優, "sheep, tenderness"
未遊, "sheep, play"
The name can also be written in hiragana or katakana.

People with the name
, Japanese table tennis player
Miyū Sawai (美優), a Japanese model, actress, and idol
Miyu Matsuki  (松来未祐) a Japanese voice actress
Miyū Tsuzurahara (未有), a Japanese voice actress and child actress
Miyū Wagawa (未優), a Japanese actress
Miyū Watase (美遊), a Japanese actress and model
Miyū Yamamoto (美憂), a Japanese female wrestler and sportscaster

Fictional characters
Miyū Shirakawa (美夕), a character in the manga series First Love Sisters
Miyu Makimura (未有), a character in the manga series Mint na Bokura

See also
Miyu

Japanese feminine given names